James Wiggins (born April 26, 1997) is an American football free safety for the Green Bay Packers of the National Football League (NFL). He played college football at Cincinnati, and was drafted by the Arizona Cardinals in the seventh round of the 2021 NFL Draft.

Early years
Wiggins attended South Dade Senior High School in Homestead, Florida. He originally committed to the University of Miami to play college football but switched his commitment to the University of Cincinnati.

College career
Wiggins played at Cincinnati from 2016 to 2020. Over the course of his college career, Wiggins was named to Bruce Feldman's college football freaks list multiple times for his outstanding athleticism.

He redshirted his first year in 2016. He became a starter his sophomore year in 2018, a season in which Wiggins would have two game winning interceptions for the Bearcats. In a September win over Ohio that year, Wiggins' interception at the 1-yard line with 52 seconds left clinched a 34–30 victory. The following month at SMU, his 86-yard "Pick Six" in overtime ended UC's 26–20 win over the Mustangs.

Wiggins missed the 2019 season due to a torn ACL. Wiggins returned from the injury in 2020 and was named an All-American by The Athletic.

Professional career

Arizona Cardinals
Wiggins was selected by the Arizona Cardinals in the seventh round (243rd overall) of the 2021 NFL Draft. On May 20, 2021, Wiggins signed his four-year rookie contract with Arizona. He was waived on August 31, 2021 and re-signed to the practice squad the next day. He was promoted to the active roster on October 12, 2021. He was placed on injured reserve on December 4.

On August 30, 2022, Wiggins was waived by the Cardinals.

Kansas City Chiefs
On September 6, 2022, Wiggins signed with the practice squad of the Kansas City Chiefs. He was released from the practice squad on September 13, 2022.

Green Bay Packers
On January 10, 2023, Wiggins signed a reserve/future contract with the Green Bay Packers.

References

External links
Green Bay Packers bio
Cincinnati Bearcats bio

1997 births
Living people
South Dade Senior High School alumni
Players of American football from Miami
American football safeties
Cincinnati Bearcats football players
Arizona Cardinals players
Kansas City Chiefs players
Green Bay Packers players